Dulwich College Beijing (DCB) is a British international school with campuses in Beijing, China. It is a branch of Dulwich College, it was the second to join the Dulwich College International (DCI) family of schools, and opened in August 2005. As of 2013 it has over 1,450 students from 12 months to 18 years.

In 2006, The Guardian listed Dulwich College Beijing jointly with Dulwich College Shanghai as among the best British international schools in the world, the only schools in its list to be located in China, citing "excellent music and sports facilities" and a majority English speaking faculty.
In 2009 the school's Chinese department director, Chen Xialin, said that the school teaches English and mathematics in small classes divided by different levels so that students may study in a "confident environment". 60% of Dulwich teachers are British.

Campuses 
There were two campuses in Beijing: The Legend Garden (丽京花园) Campus in Shunyi District, and the Beijing Riviera Campus in Chaoyang District. The two campuses served 1- to 18-year-olds and 1- to 6-year-olds respectively. However, in 2018, the Rivera campus has been made no longer active. Merging the students of the two campuses into one has occurred.

Academics 
The primary teaching language is English, with a Dual Language approach in Mandarin and English. Children up to age 5 follow the Early Years Foundation Stage, from Year 1 to Year 9, they follow the National Curriculum of England and Wales.

Students of Dulwich College Beijing's Senior School begin their high school curriculum in Years 10 and 11, where they follow an internationally recognised version of the British GCSEs, IGCSEs. They then transition into the International Baccalaureate Diploma Programme during Years 12 and 13 (the US equivalent of grades 11 and 12.)

Operations
In 2015 the tuition for the year was 250,000 renminbi ($40,275 U.S. dollars). China Daily ranked Dulwich Beijing as the 4th most expensive private school in Beijing.

The school includes a programme for students with German as a first language.

Awards
In the 2016-2017 academic year, Dulwich has been honoured to receive three distinctions: the prestigious British International School Award in the "Teaching Initiative of the Year" category"", a Diplomats’ Choice in the "Best International School" category", as well as being named "Best International School" at the Expat Life Awards.

See also

 Education in Beijing
 Britons in China
 List of international schools
Affiliated Dulwich schools:
 Dulwich College
 Dulwich College Singapore
 Dulwich College Shanghai
 Dulwich College Suzhou
 Dulwich International High School Suzhou
 Dulwich International High School Zhuhai
Other British schools in Beijing:
 Harrow International School of Beijing
 British School of Beijing

References

External links
 Dulwich College Beijing website

International schools in Beijing
International Baccalaureate schools in China
Schools in Chaoyang District, Beijing
Schools in Shunyi District
Educational institutions established in 2005
High schools in Beijing
Beijing
British international schools in China
Schools in China
2005 establishments in China